Monte Carlo is an Edwardian musical comedy in two acts with a book by Sidney Carlton, music by Howard Talbot and lyrics by Harry Greenbank. The work was first performed at the Avenue Theatre in London, opening on 27 August 1896. The New York production opened on March 21, 1898 at the Herald Square Theatre.

Roles and original London cast

Musical numbers
Act I 
Opening Chorus - "Here at Monte Carlo's tables, all our hopes on fortune staking..." 
Recit. and Song - Croupier & Chorus - "Now here's a chance for visitors, both masculine and feminine..." 
Duet - Ethel & Harry - "Within my chambers daily I sit before my table..." 
Trio - Sir Benjamin, General, & Mrs. Carthew - "When a widow makes impression with her beauty rich and regal..." 
Song - Dorothy - "O land of heart's desire where love is king, and fancy all a-fire..." 
Duet - Dorothy & Dorian - "Along the way where lovers go the roses red are twining..." 
Duet - Suzanne & James - "The use of French you ask of me, but spite of your professions..." 
Song - Dorian & Men's Chorus - "They tell me that life is a riddle; but whatever may chance..." 
Song & March - General Boomerang & Chorus - "Have you ever heard the story of my long career of glory..." 
Quartette & Dance - Bertie, Gertie, James & Lorrimer - "I am Gertie Gelatine, and it's easy to be seen..." 
Song - Jemima & Chorus - "I'm the pet of all the 'alls - I'm Jemima!  And they whistles and they calls for Jemima..." 
Duet and Dance - Jemima & Sir Benjamin - "A worthy rural Dean a pair of legs could boast of..." 
Hornpipe Trio - Mrs. Carthew, General & Sir Benjamin - "If you'll only come a-cruising..." 
Finale Act I - "Oh, what is the matter?   Oh, what has occurr'd? ..."

Act II 
Chorus of Sailors - "We're an able bodied crew, and our duty is to wrestle..." 
Recit and Song - Captain Rossiter - "O gallant tars..." & "Before I sail'd this elegant craft..." 
Trio - Mrs. Carthew, Dorothy, Suzanne & Chorus - "Now of course you know the duties of a lady's maid..." 
Song - Mrs. Carthew - "When you meet some lovely syren who has big bewitching eyes..." 
Song - General - "We have distinguish'd visitors in England now and then..."   *** 
Quartette - Mrs. Carthew, Dorothy, General & Sir Benjamin - "Whatever's the use of a maid..." 
Song - Lorrimer - "Oh, the autumn leaves are falling and the days are closing in..."   (6 verses) 
Eccentric Dance (Francois) 
Concerted Piece - "Across the waters blue we're very proud to see..." 
Recit. & Song - Dorian - "Back from the field..." & "Oh, the Scarlet Coat so bright is an Englishman's delight..." 
Skirt Dance and Can-Can 
Song - Bertie, with Gertie, Sir Benjamin & Lorrimer - "I'm a stupid little maiden who's afraid to venture out..." 
Colour Duet & Dance - Suzanne & James - "In the mediaeval ages with their troubadours and pages..." 
Duet - Jemima & Lorrimore - "Two Spanish senora are we, exceedingly giddy and gushing..." 
Song - Dorian - "No eloquence is mine my cause to plead whose music it were dear delight to heed..." 
Song - "Fiddle di diddle di diddle di dee" (singer unspecified) - "A very prim and prudent maid..."   *** 
Finale Act II - "When man to maid proposes - O Day of dear delight!..."

References

1896 musicals
West End musicals
Original musicals